The 2016 Open de Nice Côte d'Azur was a men's tennis tournament played on outdoor clay courts. It was the 32nd and final edition of the Open de Nice Côte d'Azur and part of the ATP World Tour 250 series of the 2016 ATP World Tour. It took place at the Nice Lawn Tennis Club in Nice, France, from 15 May until 21 May 2016. The tournament was replaced on the ATP World Tour by the Lyon Open. First-seeded Dominic Thiem won the singles title.

Singles main draw entrants

Seeds 

 Rankings are as of May 9, 2016.

Other entrants 
The following players received wildcards into the singles main draw:
  Kevin Anderson
  Fabio Fognini
  Quentin Halys

The following player received entry using a protected ranking:
  Brian Baker

The following players received entry from the qualifying draw:
  Kyle Edmund
  Daniil Medvedev
  Diego Schwartzman
  Donald Young

Withdrawals 
Before the tournament
  Martin Kližan →replaced by  Chung Hyeon
  Juan Mónaco →replaced by   Adrian Mannarino
  Tommy Robredo →replaced by  Daniel Muñoz de la Nava

Retirements 
  Kyle Edmund (left ankle injury)

Doubles main draw entrants

Seeds 

 Rankings are as of May 9, 2016.

Other entrants 
The following pairs received wildcards into the doubles main draw:
  Mathias Bourgue /  Quentin Halys
  Hsieh Cheng-peng /  Yang Tsung-hua

The following pair received entry as alternates:
  Víctor Estrella Burgos /  Daniel Muñoz de la Nava

Withdrawals 
Before the tournament
  Diego Schwartzman (left foot injury)

During the tournament
  Denis Kudla (lower back injury)

Finals

Singles 

  Dominic Thiem defeated  Alexander Zverev, 6–4, 3–6, 6–0

Doubles 

 Juan Sebastián Cabal /  Robert Farah defeated  Mate Pavić /  Michael Venus, 4–6, 6–4, [10–8]

References

External links 
 Official website

 
Open de Nice Côte d'Azur
Open de Nice Côte d'Azur
Open de Nice
21st century in Nice